Miguel Hernandez (born September 21, 1974 in Chicago, Illinois) is an American boxer.

Professional career 
Known as "Macho", Miguel began his professional career in 2003.  When he stepped up in competition, he lost both fights: to Raúl Márquez and to Luis Ramon Campas in 2006. He won two titles, the WBC USNBC title and the Illinois state title. He is currently beginning his career as a boxing trainer.

External links

References

1974 births
Boxers from Chicago
Living people
The Contender (TV series) participants
American male boxers